The term modern period or modern era (sometimes also called modern history or modern times) is the period of history that succeeds the Middle Ages (which ended approximately 1500 AD). This terminology is a historical periodization that is applied primarily to European and Western history.

The modern era can be further divided as follows:
 The early modern period lasted from c. AD 1500 to 1800 and resulted in wide-ranging intellectual, political and economic change. It brought with it the Age of Enlightenment, the Industrial Revolution and an Age of Revolutions, beginning with those in America and France and later spreading in other countries, partly as a result of upheavals of the Napoleonic Wars. 
 The late modern period began around 1800 with the end of the political revolutions in the late 18th century and involved the transition from a world dominated by imperial and colonial powers into one of nations and nationhood following the two great world wars, World War I and World War II, and the Cold War. The period following the end of World War II in 1945 and continuing to the present is called contemporary history, which is alternatively considered either a subperiod of the late modern period or a separate period beginning after the late modern period.

The modern period has been a period of significant development in the fields of science, politics, warfare, and technology. It has also been an age of discovery and globalization. During this time, the European powers and later their colonies, began a political, economic, and cultural colonization of the rest of the world. 

By the late 19th and early 20th century, modernist art, politics, science and culture has come to dominate not only Western Europe and North America, but almost every civilized area on the globe, including movements thought of as opposed to the western world and globalization. The modern era is closely associated with the development of individualism, capitalism, urbanization and a belief in the positive possibilities of technological and political progress.

The brutal wars and other problems of this era, many of which come from the effects of rapid change, and the connected loss of strength of traditional religious and ethical norms, have led to many reactions against modern development. Optimism and the belief in constant progress have been most recently criticized by postmodernism, while the dominance of Western Europe and North America over the rest of the world has been criticized by postcolonial theory.

Terminology

Eras can not easily be defined more exactly than by centuries. 1500 is an approximate starting period for the modern era because many major events caused the Western world to change around that time: from the Fall of Constantinople (1453), completion of the Reconquista (1492), Gutenberg's moveable type printing press (1450s) and Christopher Columbus's voyage to the Americas (both 1492), to the Protestant Reformation begun with Martin Luther's Ninety-five Theses (1517).

The term "modern" was coined shortly before 1585 to describe the beginning of a new era.

The term "Early Modern" was introduced in the English language in the 1930s to distinguish the time between what we call Middle Ages and time of the late Enlightenment (1800) (when the meaning of the term Modern Ages was developing its contemporary form). 

Sometimes distinct from the modern periods themselves, the terms "modernity" and "modernism" refer to a new way of thinking, distinct from medieval thinking.

The European Renaissance (about 1420–1630) is an important transition period beginning between the Late Middle Ages and Early Modern Times, which started in Italy.

"Postmodernism", coined 1949, on the other hand, would describe rather a movement in art than a period of history, and is usually applied to arts, but not to any events of the very recent history. This changed, when postmodernity was coined to describe the major changes in the 1950s and 1960s in economy, society, culture, and philosophy.

It is important to note that these terms stem from European History; in worldwide usage, such as in China, India, and Islam, the terms are applied in a very different way, but often in the context with their contact with European culture in the Age of Discoveries.

Characteristics
The concept of the modern world as distinct from an ancient or medieval world rests on a sense that the modern world is not just another era in history, but rather the result of a new type of change. This is usually conceived of as progress driven by deliberate human efforts to better their situation.

Advances in all areas of human activity—politics, industry, society, economics, commerce, transport, communication,  mechanization, automation, science, medicine, technology, and culture—appear to have transformed an Old World into the Modern or New World.  In each case, the identification of the old Revolutionary change can be used to demarcate the old and old-fashioned from the modern.

Much of the Modern world replaced the Biblical-oriented value system, revalued the monarchical government system, and abolished the feudal economic system, with new democratic and liberal ideas in the areas of politics, science, psychology, sociology, and economics.

Some events of modern history, though born out of context not entirely new, show a new way of perceiving the world. The concept of modernity interprets the general meaning of these events and seeks explanations for major developments.  Historians analyse the events taking place in Modern Times, since the so-called "Middle Ages" (between Modern and Ancient Times).

Early modern period

Late 15th to 17th century

Renaissance and early Reformation (ca. 1450–1600)
Gutenberg's moveable type printing press (1450s): information age and newspapers.
Discovery of America (1492): Voyages of Christopher Columbus.
Machiavelli's Il Principe (The Prince) started to circulate.
Copernicus and the beginning of the Scientific Revolution
Martin Luther challenges the Church on 31 October 1517 with the 95 Theses: Reformation.
Age of Discovery
Mercantilist economic theory and policy
Fall of the Spanish Armada 8 August 1588 enabled the Rise of the British Empire

Late Reformation and early Baroque (ca. 1600–1700)
The "Baroque" is a term usually applied to the history of art, architecture and music during this period.
Thirty Years' War 1618–1648 in Central Europe decimated the population by up to 20%.
The treaties of the Peace of Westphalia are signed in 1648, which ended several wars in Europe and established the beginning of sovereign states.
The Glorious Revolution of 1688 establishes modern parliamentary democracy in England.
Continuation of the Scientific Revolution
The beginning of the reign of Louis XIV r. 1643–1715, an example of the Age of Absolutism.

18th century

Age of Enlightenment and early Age of Revolution (ca. 1700–1800)
War of the Spanish Succession (1701–1714)
The 1713 Peace of Utrecht marked the change from Spanish to British naval supremacy.
War of the Austrian Succession (1740–1748)
Seven Years' War (1754–1763)
American Revolution (1765–1783)
French Revolution (1789–1799)
The beginning of the Industrial Revolution around 1760.

Late modern period

Industrial Revolution

  

The Industrial Revolution was the major technological, socioeconomic, and cultural change in late 18th and early 19th century that began in Britain and spread throughout the world.  During that time, an economy based on manual labour was replaced by one dominated by industry and the manufacture of machinery.  It began with the mechanisation of the textile industries and the development of iron-making techniques, and trade expansion was enabled by the introduction of canals, improved roads, and then railways. The introduction of steam power (fuelled primarily by coal) and powered machinery (mainly in textile manufacturing) underpinned the dramatic increases in production capacity.  The development of all-metal machine tools in the first two decades of the 19th century facilitated the manufacture of more production machines for manufacturing in other industries.

The date of the Industrial Revolution is not exact.  Eric Hobsbawm held that it 'broke out' in the 1780s and wasn't fully felt until the 1830s or 1840s, while T.S. Ashton held that it occurred roughly between 1760 and 1830 (in effect the reigns of George III, The Regency, and George IV). 

The effects spread throughout Western Europe and North America during the 19th century, eventually affecting the majority of the world.  The impact of this change on society was enormous and is often compared to the Neolithic revolution, when mankind developed agriculture and gave up its nomadic lifestyle.

The first Industrial Revolution merged into the Second Industrial Revolution around 1850, when technological and economic progress gained momentum with the development of steam-powered ships and railways, and later in the nineteenth century with the internal combustion engine and electric power generation.

It has been argued that GDP per capita was much more stable and progressed at a much slower rate until the industrial revolution and the emergence of the modern capitalist economy, and that it has since increased rapidly in capitalist countries.

Napoleonic Era

The Napoleonic Era is a period in the History of France and Europe. It is generally classified as the fourth stage of the French Revolution, the first being the National Assembly, the second being the Legislative Assembly, and the third being the Directory. The Napoleonic Era begins roughly with Napoleon's coup d'état, overthrowing the Directory and ends at the Hundred Days and his defeat at Waterloo (November 9 1799 – June 28 1815).  The congress of Vienna soon set out to restore Europe to pre-French revolution days.

19th century

Historians sometimes define a nineteenth century historical era stretching from 1815 (the Congress of Vienna) to 1914 (the outbreak of the First World War); alternatively, Eric Hobsbawm defined the "Long Nineteenth Century" as spanning the years 1789 to 1914.

During this century, the Spanish, Portuguese, and Ottoman empires began to crumble and the Holy Roman and Mughal empires ceased.

Following the Napoleonic Wars, the British Empire became the world's leading power, controlling one quarter of the World's population and one third of the land area. It enforced a Pax Britannica, encouraged trade, and battled rampant piracy.

Slavery was greatly reduced around the world. Following a successful slave revolt in Haiti, Britain forced the Barbary pirates to halt their practice of kidnapping and enslaving Europeans, banned slavery throughout its domain, and charged its navy with ending the global slave trade. Slavery was then abolished in Russia, America, and Brazil (see Abolitionism).

Following the abolition of the slave trade, and propelled by economic exploitation, the Scramble for Africa was initiated formally at the Berlin West Africa Conference in 1884–1885.  All the major European powers laid claim to the areas of Africa where they could exhibit a sphere of influence over the area.  These claims did not have to have any substantial land holdings or treaties to be legitimate. The French gained major ground in  West Africa, the British in East Africa, and the Portuguese and Spanish at various points throughout the continent, while Leopold II of Belgium was able to retain his personal fiefdom, Congo. 

Electricity, steel, and petroleum fuelled a Second Industrial Revolution which enabled Germany, Japan, and the United States to become Great Powers that raced to create empires of their own. However, Russia and Qing Dynasty China failed to keep pace with the other world powers which led to massive social unrest in both empires.

20th century

Above all, the 20th century is distinguished from most of human history in that its most significant changes were directly or indirectly economic and technological in nature. 

Economic development was the force behind vast changes in everyday life, to a degree which was unprecedented in human history. The great changes of centuries before the 19th were more connected with ideas, religion or military conquest, and technological advance had only made small changes in the material wealth of ordinary people.  Over the course of the 20th century, the world’s per-capita gross domestic product grew by a factor of five , much more than all earlier centuries combined (including the 19th with its Industrial Revolution).  Many economists make the case that this understates the magnitude of growth, as many of the goods and services consumed at the end of the century, such as improved medicine (causing world life expectancy to increase by more than two decades) and communications technologies, were not available at any price at its beginning.  However, the gulf between the world’s rich and poor grew much wider than it had ever been in the past, and the majority of the global population remained in the poor side of the divide.

Still, advancing technology and medicine has had a great impact even in the Global South. Large-scale industry and more centralized media made brutal dictatorships possible on an unprecedented scale in the middle of the century, leading to wars that were also unprecedented. However, the increased communications contributed to democratization.

Technological developments included the development of airplanes and space exploration, nuclear technology, advancement in genetics, and the dawning of the Information Age.

Major political developments included the Israeli–Palestinian conflict, two world wars, and the Cold War.  It also saw the former British Empire lose most of its remaining political power over commonwealth countries, most notably by ways of the dividing of the British crown into several sovereignties by the Statute of Westminster, the patriation of constitutions by the Canada Act 1982 and the Australia Act 1986, and by the independence of countries like India, Pakistan, South Africa, and Ireland.

World War I

The First World War was a world conflict, raging from July 1914 to the final Armistice on 11 November 1918. The Allied Powers, led by the British Empire, France, Russia until March 1918, Japan and the United States after 1917, defeated the Central Powers, led by the German Empire, Austro-Hungarian Empire and the Ottoman Empire. The war caused the disintegration of four empires — the Austro-Hungarian, German, Ottoman, and Russian ones — as well as radical change in the European and Middle Eastern maps. The Allied powers before 1917 are sometimes referred to as the Triple Entente, and the Central Powers are sometimes referred to as the Triple Alliance.

Much of the fighting in World War I took place along the Western Front, within a system of opposing manned trenches and fortifications (separated by a “No man's land”) running from the North Sea to the border of Switzerland. On the Eastern Front, the vast eastern plains and limited rail network prevented a trench warfare stalemate from developing, although the scale of the conflict was just as large.  Hostilities also occurred on and under the sea and — for the first time — from the air. More than 9 million soldiers died on the various battlefields, and nearly that many more in the participating countries' home fronts on account of food shortages and genocide committed under the cover of various civil wars and internal conflicts. Notably, more people died of the worldwide influenza outbreak at the end of the war and shortly after than died in the hostilities.  The unsanitary conditions engendered by the war, severe overcrowding in barracks, wartime propaganda interfering with public health warnings, and migration of so many soldiers around the world helped the outbreak become a pandemic.

Ultimately, World War I created a decisive break with the old world order that had emerged after the Napoleonic Wars, which was modified by the mid-19th century’s nationalistic revolutions.  The results of World War I would be important factors in the development of World War II approximately 20 years later.

Interwar period

The Interwar period was the period between the end of World War I in 1918 and the beginning of World War II in 1939. It included the Roaring Twenties, the Great Depression, and the rise of communism in Russia and fascism in Italy and Germany.

World War II

World War II  was a global military conflict that took place in 1939–1945. It was the largest and deadliest war in history, culminating in the Holocaust and ending with the dropping of the atom bomb.

Even though Japan had been fighting in China since 1937, the conventional view is that the war began on September 1, 1939, when Nazi Germany invaded Poland. Within two days the United Kingdom and France declared war on Germany, even though the fighting was confined to Poland. Pursuant to a then-secret provision of its non-aggression Molotov–Ribbentrop Pact, the Soviet Union joined with Germany on September 17, 1939, to conquer Poland and to divide Eastern Europe. 

The Allies were initially made up of Poland, the United Kingdom, France, Australia, Canada, New Zealand, South Africa, as well as British Commonwealth countries which were controlled directly by the UK, such as the Indian Empire. All of these countries declared war on Germany in September 1939.

Following the lull in fighting, known as the "Phoney War", Germany invaded western Europe in May 1940. Six weeks later, France, in the mean time attacked by Italy as well, surrendered to Germany, which then tried unsuccessfully to conquer Britain. On September 27, Germany, Italy, and Japan signed a mutual defense agreement, the Tripartite Pact, and were known as the Axis Powers. 

Nine months later, on June 22, 1941, Germany launched a massive invasion of the Soviet Union, which promptly joined the Allies. Germany was now engaged in fighting a war on two fronts. This proved to be a mistake by Germany; many historians believe that if Germany had successfully carried out the invasion of Britain and put forth their best effort, the war may have turned in favor of the Axis.

On  December 7, 1941, Japan attacked the United States at Pearl Harbor, bringing it too into the war on the Allied side. China also joined the Allies, as eventually did most of the rest of the world. China was in turmoil at the time, and attacked Japanese armies through guerilla-type warfare. By the beginning of 1942, the major combatants were aligned as follows: the British Commonwealth, the United States, and the Soviet Union were fighting Germany and Italy; and the British Commonwealth, China, and the United States were fighting Japan. From then through August 1945, battles raged across all of Europe, in the North Atlantic Ocean, across North Africa, throughout Southeast Asia, throughout China, across the Pacific Ocean and in the air over Japan.

Italy surrendered in September 1943 and split in a northern Germany-occupied puppet state and in an Allies-friendly state in the South; Germany surrendered in May 1945. Following the atomic bombings of Hiroshima and Nagasaki, Japan surrendered, marking the end of the war on September 2, 1945.

It is possible that around 62 million people died in the war; estimates vary greatly. About 60% of all casualties were civilians, who died as a result of disease, starvation, genocide (in particular, the Holocaust), and aerial bombing. The former Soviet Union and China suffered the most casualties. Estimates place deaths in the Soviet Union at around 23 million, while China suffered about 10 million. No country lost a greater portion of its population than Poland: approximately 5.6 million, or 16%, of its pre-war population of 34.8 million died.

The Holocaust (which roughly means "burnt whole") was the deliberate and systematic murder of millions of Jews and other "unwanted" during World War II by the Nazi regime in Germany. Several differing views exist regarding whether it was intended to occur from the war's beginning, or if the plans for it came about later.  Regardless, persecution of Jews extended well before the war even started, such as in the Kristallnacht (Night of Broken Glass).  The Nazis used propaganda to great effect to stir up anti-Semitic feelings within ordinary Germans.

After World War II, Europe was informally split into Western and Soviet spheres of influence. Western Europe later aligned as North Atlantic Treaty Organization (NATO) and Eastern Europe as the Warsaw Pact. There was a shift in power from Western Europe and the British Empire to the two new superpowers, the United States and the Soviet Union. These two rivals would later face off in the Cold War. In Asia, the defeat of Japan led to its democratization. China's civil war continued through and after the war, resulting eventually in the establishment of the People's Republic of China. The former colonies of the European powers began their road to independence.

Cold War and 1990s

The Cold War between the "West" (the United States, Western Europe, and Japan) and the "East" (the Soviet Union, Eastern Europe, and partially China) dominated politics from the end of World War II in 1945 until the collapse of the Soviet Union in 1991, at which point the Cold War ended and the post–Cold War era began (which includes most of the 1990s, the last decade of the 20th century).

The Korean War and Vietnam War, and later the Soviet–Afghan War, dominated the political life, while the counterculture of the 1960s and the rise of computers changed society in very different, complex ways, including higher social and local mobility.

At the end of the twentieth century, the world was at a major crossroads.  Throughout the century, more technological advances had been made than in all of preceding history.  Computers, the Internet, and other technology radically altered daily lives.  However, several problems faced the world during the Cold War period and the 1990s that followed.

First of all, the gap between rich and poor nations continued to widen.  Some said that this problem could not be fixed, that there were a set amount of wealth and it could only be shared by so many.  Others said that the powerful nations with large economies were not doing enough to help improve the rapidly evolving economies of the Third World.  However, developing countries faced many challenges, including the scale of the task to be surmounted, rapidly growing populations, and the need to protect the environment, and the cost that goes along with it.

Secondly, disease threatened to destabilize many regions of the world.  Viruses such as West Nile and bird flu continued to spread quickly and easily.  In poor nations, malaria and other diseases affected the majority of the population.  Millions were infected with HIV, the virus which causes AIDS, which was becoming an epidemic in southern Africa and around the world.

Increased globalization, specifically Americanization, was also occurring.  While not necessarily a threat, it was causing anti-Western and anti-American feelings in parts of the world, especially the Middle East.  English was quickly becoming the global language, with people who did not speak it becoming increasingly disadvantaged.

Terrorism, dictatorship, and the spread of nuclear weapons were also issues requiring immediate attention. Dictators such as Kim Jong-il in North Korea continued to lead their nations toward the development of nuclear weapons.  The fear existed that not only are terrorists already attempting to get nuclear weapons, but that they have already obtained them.

21st century

The 2000s decade refers to the years from 2000 to 2009 inclusively. The 2000s were marked generally with an escalation of the social issues of the 1990s, which included the rise of terrorism, stress, the rapid, exponential expansion of economic globalization on an unprecedented scale, the rapid expansion of communications and telecommunications with mobile phones and the Internet and international pop culture.

In North America and the Middle East, most major political developments in the 2000s revolved around the War on Terrorism and the Iraq War. Elsewhere, the major theme was the rapid development of Asia's economic and political potential, with China, experiencing immense economic growth, moving toward the status of a regional power and billion-consumer market. India, along with many other developing countries, was also growing rapidly, and began integrating itself into the world economy.

A trend connecting economic and political events in North America, Asia, and the Middle East was the rapidly increasing demand for fossil fuels, which, along with fewer new petroleum finds, greater extraction costs (see peak oil), and political turmoil, saw the price of gas and oil soar ~500% between 2000 and 2005. In some places, especially in Europe, gas could be $5 a gallon, depending on the currency.

Major events relating to the War on Terrorism included the September 11, 2001 Attacks, the Moscow Theatre Siege, the 2003 Istanbul bombings, the Madrid train bombings, the Beslan school hostage crisis, the 2005 London bombings, the October 2005 New Delhi bombings, and the 2008 Mumbai Hotel Siege.

The violence in Iraq, even after democratic elections on January 30, 2005, caused much political stir in all countries occupying the country (USA, Britain, Australia, etc), and political debates of these countries in 2006 and 2007 were highly influenced by the unstable situation in the Near East, especially Iraq and the discussion over Iran's nuclear weapons program.

Less influential, but omnipresent, was the debate on Turkey's participation in the European Union.

New virus strains, such as SARS and swine flu, emerged and spread during the 2000s.

See also
 Post-classical history
 Quarrel of the Ancients and the Moderns
 Timelines of modern history

References

External links
China and Europe

Historical eras
Modern history

bn:আধুনিক বিশ্ব
bs:Novi vijek
ca:Edat moderna
el:Μοντέρνα Εποχή
es:Edad Moderna
lb:Neizäit
lt:Naujieji laikai
ja:近代
nl:Moderne tijd
pl:Historia nowożytna
pt:Idade Moderna
ru:Новейшее время
yi:נייע צייט